Riccardo Maria Maglio (born 24 April 1999) is an Italian pair skater. With his skating partner, Irma Caldara, he has won four senior international medals, including gold at the 2022 Bavarian Open and 2022 Trophée Métropole Nice Côte d'Azur.

Career

Early years 
Maglio began learning to skate in 2007.

He skated four seasons with Giulia Papa. The two made their international debut in February 2018, appearing in junior pairs at the Ice Mall Cup. Their other international appearances were also as juniors.

Papa/Maglio moved up to seniors for their fourth and final season as a pair but did not compete internationally. They finished fourth at the Italian Championships in December 2020.

2021–22 season: Debut of Caldara/Maglio 
Maglio began competing in partnership with Irma Caldara. The two placed tenth at their first international event, the Lombardia Trophy in September 2021, and fourteenth at the 2021 CS Golden Spin of Zagreb in December. In January, they took bronze at the Icelab International Cup before winning the Bavarian Open.

2022–23 season 
Caldara/Maglio won silver at the Lombardia Trophy in September and gold at the Trophée Métropole Nice Côte d'Azur in October. They were assigned to make their Grand Prix debut and finished in fifth place at the 2022 MK John Wilson Trophy. Caldara/Maglio then finished fourth at the 2022 NHK Trophy, 11.42 points back of bronze medalists McIntosh/Mimar of Canada.

Programs

With Caldara

Competitive highlights 
GP: Grand Prix; CS: Challenger Series; JGP: Junior Grand Prix

With Caldara

With Papa

References

External links 
 
 
 

1999 births
Italian male pair skaters
Living people
Sportspeople from Milan